"The Mercy Seat" is a song written by Nick Cave (lyrics and music) and Mick Harvey (music), originally performed by Nick Cave and the Bad Seeds on the 1988 album Tender Prey. The song has been covered by others, including Johnny Cash, Camille O'Sullivan and Unter Null. Rolling Stone editor Toby Creswell lists it as one of the 1001 greatest songs.

Content
The song tells the story of a man about to be executed by the electric chair. The "Mercy Seat" refers both to the kaporet (the lid of the Ark of the Covenant) and to the electric chair. The song is laden with allusions to Christianity; in the Old Testament, the mercy seat is the symbol of the throne of God over the Ark of the Covenant.

The song contains the following chorus:

And the mercy seat is waiting
And I think my head is burning
And in a way I'm yearning
To be done with all this measuring of proof.
An eye for an eye
And a tooth for a tooth
And anyway I told the truth
And I'm not afraid to die.

This section is repeated fifteen times during the course of the song, with a number of variations in the text.

Like many of Cave's songs, "The Mercy Seat" suggests autobiography. Critics have noted the confluence of themes from the Old and the New Testament, especially in its juxtaposing the "eye for an eye" justice of the Old Testament with the merciful appearance of the "ragged stranger," Christ. This "problem of the relationship between the law and forgiveness" remains unresolved.

Cave later said, "Before I was able to write things like, 'I'm not afraid to die'. And kids come up to me and say, 'Hey, that line means so much to me'. And I have to sort of say I don't feel that way any more. I don't feel as cocky about death as I used to. I wake up in mad panics about death approaching."

Versions
On the original album version, Cave's vocals are delivered over a thick backing of guitars, organ, and strings, with much of the text nearly inaudible. An acoustic version was also released as part of a bonus CD/7" for the album The Good Son entitled Acoustic Versions from Tender Prey. This version was later reissued to appear on both the Stripped EP and B-Sides & Rarities. The song is a live standard of Cave's, and has been performed at almost every concert since 1988; an acoustic live version, performed in the United States in 1989, appears in the documentary The Road to God Knows Where. A much louder version appears as the opening track of the 1993 album Live Seeds.

An acoustic version recorded in May 1998 for Keith Cameron's Xfm show, The Carve Up, was released on a compilation CD of the same name in 1999.

The song also features on the 2013 live album Live from KCRW.

Notable covers and references

Johnny Cash, American Recordings III
Country singer Johnny Cash covered the song on his 2000 album American III: Solitary Man, as one of a number of songs Cash sang about the "convicted innocent." Cash stated he heard the song after seeing the news about executions in Texas, and that more attention should be paid to capital punishment: "If a man's been there 25 years, maybe we should consider whether or not he has become a good human being and do we still want to kill him." Cash's version features guitar, organ, and piano accompaniment.

Cave commented on Cash's cover in a number of interviews: "Like all the songs he does, he made it his own. He's a great interpreter of songs – that's part of his genius. These are the things that can't be taken away from you." He called it a personal highpoint: "'It doesn't matter what anyone says,' remarked Cave proudly. 'Johnny Cash recorded my song.'"

Other covers

Others have recorded covers of this song. Stromkern released a cover on the 1997 album Flicker Like a Candle.  The electro-industrial music project Unter Null covered the song for the 2010 album Moving On. The Red Paintings also covered the song on the Nick Cave tribute album 'Eye for an Eye'.  The German Dark Wave band Goethes Erben released a translated version of the song, entitled Sitz der Gnade.

References to the song
Four lines from the song serve as one of the epigraphs for Neil LaBute's 2002 play The Mercy Seat.

Track listing
The track listing for the single is:

CD
 "The Mercy Seat" (single version)
 "New Day" [actually "New Morning" mistitled]
 "From Her to Eternity" (film version)
 "Tupelo" (single version)

7"
 "The Mercy Seat" (single version)
 "New Day"

12"
 "The Mercy Seat" (full-length album version)
 "New Day" [actually "New Morning" mistitled]
 "The Mercy Seat" (video mix)

Charts

See also
Nick Cave and The Bad Seeds discography

References

Nick Cave songs
1988 singles
Songs about death
Songs about criminals
Song recordings produced by Flood (producer)
Songs written by Nick Cave
Songs written by Mick Harvey
1987 songs
Mute Records singles